Butterfly tail may refer to:
 V-tail, an arrangement of the tail on aircraft
 Butterfly tail (goldfish), a breed of goldfish

See also
 Pelikan tail